Bennye Gatteys (born November 20, 1940) is an American singer and actress who appeared in many anthology television series and soap operas.

Early life 

Gatteys grew up in Dallas, Texas. The unusual spelling of her first name is because her parents originally wanted a boy.

At the age of two she sang in her church's choir. By the age of eight she began studying piano and sought to become a concert pianist.

At age 15, visiting a friend in New York City, she appeared on a game show, Name That Tune, during which she won $19,000 after a series of appearances.

Career 

Gatteys' career in musical theater was jump-started when she was discovered at the age of 15 by Broadway producer Kermit Bloomgarden, who cast her in a production of The Diary of Anne Frank as the understudy of Susan Strasberg, who played Anne Frank.

Her first big break in television came at the age of 16, during her appearance in the television anthology series Look Up and Live, in which she co-starred opposite a then-teenaged Warren Beatty. During the short-lived series, Beatty and Gatteys formed a strong connection; Gatteys recalled Beatty walking her home from rehearsals and shoots and described him as her "big brother, friend, [and] companion". She helped him read for a starring role in the Broadway musical Ohio.

She eventually married a banker from Texas and returned to Dallas for seven years, during which time her career remained dormant. After her divorce, she moved to Los Angeles to restart her acting career in soap operas, including a starring role in Days of Our Lives as Susan Martin.

Her career continued largely in the field of theater, soap operas, and occasional variety and game shows, until she retired from show business in 1977. In 1980 she began a real estate career and was her office's top producer in 1983 and 1985.

Partial filmography

The United States Steel Hour (Tom Sawyer, 1956)
Kraft Television Theatre (I Am Fifteen and Don't Want to Die, 1956)
Captain Kangaroo (1959)
Stoney Burke
Straightaway (1962) — episode "Escape to Darkness" as Jill
Gunsmoke (1963)
The Outer Limits (1963)
Days of Our Lives (1973–76)
Match Game '76 (1976)

References

External links

1940 births
Actresses from Dallas
Living people
20th-century American actresses
American television actresses
American soap opera actresses
American stage actresses
21st-century American women